Rutela lineola is a species of beetles from the family Scarabaeidae.

Description
Rutela lineola can reach a length of about 16–20 mm. This species is very variable. The basic colour is black, with white, yellow, orange or reddish markings on the head, the pronotum and the elytra. Adults feed on flowers and on decaying wood. Larvae are xylophagous and they are usually found inside decaying trunks.

Distribution
This species can be found in Argentina, Paraguay, Uruguay, Brazil, Colombia and Peru.

References
 Biolib
 World Field Guide

Scarabaeidae
Beetles described in 1767
Taxa named by Carl Linnaeus